The Greenpoint Avenue station is a station on the IND Crosstown Line of the New York City Subway. Located at the intersection of Greenpoint and Manhattan Avenues in Greenpoint, Brooklyn, it is served by the G train at all times.

History 

Greenpoint Avenue opened as part of the first phase of the IND Crosstown Line, with service south to Nassau Avenue in Brooklyn. This station opened on August 19, 1933.

As part of the 2015–2019 Metropolitan Transportation Authority Capital Program, elevators were added to the platforms and street, which makes the station fully compliant with accessibility guidelines under the Americans with Disabilities Act of 1990. Construction started in September 2018 and was expected to be completed by December 2020, but opened a few days earlier in late November 2020. There are three elevators: one from the mezzanine to street level on the eastern side of Manhattan Avenue north of Greenpoint Avenue, and one to each platform. The project is expected to cost $23.4 million.

Station layout

This underground station has two tracks and two side platforms. Both platforms have a green trim line with a black border and mosaic name tablets reading "GREENPOINT AVE." in white sans-serif font on a black background and green border. Directly below the trim line are tile name captions reading "GREENPT" in white lettering on a black background. Directional tile signs are below some of the name tablets and green I-beam columns run along both platforms at regular intervals, alternating ones having the standard black name plate in white lettering.

This is the northernmost station on the IND Crosstown Line in Brooklyn. To the north, the line goes under Newtown Creek into Long Island City, Queens.

Exits
The station's full-time entrance/exit is at the south end, which is the more heavily used of the station's two entry-exit points. The large mezzanine above the platforms and tracks has three staircases to each side with directional mosaics reading "Brooklyn" and "L. I. City and Jamaica" and green columns. Outside the turnstile bank, there is a token booth and three staircases going up to all corners of Manhattan and Greenpoint Avenues except the northeast one. G trains, which are about half the length of the  platform, stop near the south end of the station.

Both platforms have an unstaffed, same-level fare control area at their north ends. Each side has one exit-only turnstile, two High Entry/Exit Turnstiles, and one staircase going up to the south side of India Street and Manhattan Avenue. The one on the Queens-bound side goes up to the southeast corner while the one on the Church Avenue-bound side goes up to the southwest corner.

References

External links 

 
 Station Reporter — G Train
 The Subway Nut — Greenpoint Avenue Pictures
 Greenpoint Avenue entrance from Google Maps Street View
 India Street entrance from Google Maps Street View
 Platforms from Google Maps Street View

1933 establishments in New York City
Greenpoint, Brooklyn
IND Crosstown Line stations
New York City Subway stations in Brooklyn
Railway stations in the United States opened in 1933